Ling Tung University (LTU) is a private university in Nantun District, Taichung, Taiwan.

The university is recognized by the Ministry of Education in Taiwan and accredited by the Accreditation Council for Business Schools and Programs (ACBSP). 

The university has four colleges: the College of Engineering, the College of Management, the College of Humanities and Social Sciences, and the College of Health Sciences. 

The university offers undergraduate and graduate programs in various fields, including engineering, management, humanities, social sciences, and health sciences.

History
The university was originally founded in 1964 as Ling Tung Junior College of Accounting. In 2005, it was updated into Ling Tung University.

Faculties
 College of Business and Management
 College of Design
 College of Fashion
 College of Information Science

Campuses
The university consists of Baowen Campus and Chun'an Campus.

Museum
The university houses the Ling Tung Numismatic Museum.

See also
 List of universities in Taiwan

References

 
1964 establishments in Taiwan
Educational institutions established in 1964
Universities and colleges in Taiwan
Technical universities and colleges in Taiwan